Éilis or Éilís (respectively  and ), anglicized as Eilish or Eylish (  or  ), is a Gaelic given name.

Notable people with the given name include:

Billie Eilish, American singer-songwriter
Eilish McColgan, British athlete
Eilís Dillon, Irish writer
Éilís Ní Dhuibhne, Irish writer
Eilish Holton, Irish girl famous for being a conjoined twin, her sister Katie did not survive an operation that separated them

Irish-language feminine given names